The Del Rey League is a high school athletic conference that is part of the CIF Southern Section. Members are mostly private, parochial schools in the South Bay affiliated the Roman Catholic Archdiocese of Los Angeles.

Member schools
 Bishop Amat Memorial High School (La Puente)
 Bishop Montgomery High School (Torrance)
 Cathedral High School (Los Angeles)
 Junípero Serra High School (Gardena)
 La Salle College Preparatory (Pasadena)
 Mary Star of the Sea High School (San Pedro)
 St. Anthony High School (Long Beach)
 St. Joseph High School (Lakewood)
 St. Paul High School (Santa Fe Springs)
 Harvard-Westlake School (Studio City) (football only member)

References

External links
 Articles about Del Rey League - Pasadena Sun 

CIF Southern Section leagues
Catholic sports organizations